is a Japanese professional footballer who plays as a right back for  club Kashima Antlers.

Career
Tsunemoto begin first youth career with Machida Ogawa FC, Yokohama F. Marinos as youth team until 2016 and entered to Meiji University from 2017 until he was graduation in 2020.

In June 2020, Tsunemoto begin first professional career with Kashima Antlers from 2021 season. He debuted in J. League against Yokohama F. Marinos in Matchweek 31 on 11 November at same year as substitute player.

On 27 June 2021, he scored his first goal as a professional in the 20th match against Hokkaido Consadole Sapporo.

Career statistics

Club
.

References

External links

1998 births
Living people
Association football people from Kanagawa Prefecture
Meiji University alumni
Japanese footballers
Japan youth international footballers
Association football defenders
Yokohama F. Marinos players
Kashima Antlers players
J1 League players